The 2013 edition of the Kyrgyzstan Cup was the annual Kyrgyzstan football competition between domestic clubs.

Play-off round

1/16 Round
The 1/16 round matches were played on 7, 8, 9 and 11 June 2013.

|}

1/8 round
The 1/8 round matches were played on 2, 3 and 4 July 2013.

|}

1/4 Round
The 1/4 round matches were played on 23 July 2013.

|}

1/2 Round
The 1/2 round matches were played 1st leg on 17-18 August and 2nd leg on 21-24 August 2013.

|}

Final
The final was played on 31 August 2013.

|}

External links

Football League Kyrgyzstan (Russian)

Kyrgyzstan Cup seasons
Cup